The De Ceremoniis (fully De cerimoniis aulae Byzantinae) is the conventional Latin name for a Greek book of ceremonial protocol at the court of the Byzantine emperors in Constantinople. In non-specialist English sources, it tends to be called the Book of Ceremonies of Constantine VII Porphyrogennetos (variably spelt), a formula used by writers including David Talbot Rice and the modern English translation.

History and sources

It was written or at least commissioned by Emperor Constantine VII (reigned 913-959), probably around 956-959. The compilation of Rep. I 17 (Leipzig, Universitätsbibliothek) was partially revised later under Nikephoros II (963-969), perhaps under the supervision of Basil Lekapenos, the imperial parakoimomenos, and it also contains earlier descriptions of the 6th century.

One of the book's appendices are the Three Treatises on Imperial Military Expeditions, a war manual written by Constantine VII for his son and successor, Romanos II.

Composition 

In its incomplete form chapters 1-37 of book I describe processions and ceremonies on religious festivals (many lesser ones, but especially great feasts like the Elevation of the Cross, Christmas, Epiphany, Palm Sunday, Good Friday, Easter and Ascension Day and saint's days like St Demetrius, St Basil etc. often extended over many days), while chapters 38-83 describe secular ceremonies or rites of passage like coronations (38-40), weddings (39,41), births (42), funerals (60), or the celebration of war triumphs during feasts at the Hippodrome like Lupercalia (73).

These protocols gave rules for imperial progresses to and from certain churches at Constantinople and the imperial palace, with fixed stations and rules for ritual actions and acclamations from specified participants (the text of acclamations and processional troparia or kontakia, but also heirmoi and stichera are mentioned), among them also ministers, senate members, leaders of the "Blues" and the "Greens" during the hippodrome's horse races who had an important role during court ceremonies. The following chapters (84-95) are taken from a 6th-century manual by Peter the Patrician. They rather describe administrative ceremonies like the appointment of certain functionaries (ch. 84,85), investitures of certain offices (86), the reception of ambassadors and the proclamation of the Western Emperor (87,88), the reception of Persian ambassadors (89,90), Anagorevseis of certain Emperors (91-96), the appointment of the senate's proedros (97). The "palace order" prescribes the conveyances required for movement (i.e. on foot, mounted, by boat), as well as the participants’ costumes and acclamations, some of which were debased Latin, which had not been an administrative language for more than three centuries.

The second book follows a very similar composition: (1) religious feasts and the description of palace buildings, (2) secular ceremonies and imperial ordonations, (3) imperial receptions and war festivities at the hippodrome, and later customs instituted by Constantine and his son Romanos.

See also
De Administrando Imperio

References

Sources

Edition and Translation

External links

 Partial translation of Book 1 and 2 by P. Stephenson

10th-century books
10th century in the Byzantine Empire
Byzantine literature
Constantine VII